United Nations Security Council resolution 1263, adopted unanimously on 13 September 1999, after reaffirming all previous resolutions on the question of the Western Sahara, the Council extended the mandate of the United Nations Mission for the Referendum in Western Sahara (MINURSO) until 14 December 1999.

The resolution began by welcoming the resumption of the identification of voters and commencement of the appeals process. In this regard, it extended MINURSO's mandate in order to complete the voter identification process, implement confidence-building measures, continue the appeals process and conclude outstanding agreements relating to the implementation of the Settlement Plan. At the time of the adoption of the resolution, 22,656 individuals had been pre-registered in El Aaiún and a further 548 individuals in Nouadhibou and Zouérat in northern Mauritania.

The Secretary-General Kofi Annan was requested to report every 45 days on significant developments relating and to submit a comprehensive assessment of steps towards the completion of the appeals process, staffing requirements, refugee repatriation and the beginning of the transitional period.

See also
 Free Zone (region)
 History of Western Sahara
 Political status of Western Sahara
 List of United Nations Security Council Resolutions 1201 to 1300 (1998–2000)
 Sahrawi Arab Democratic Republic
 Moroccan Western Sahara Wall

References

External links
 
Text of the Resolution at undocs.org

 1263
1999 in Morocco
 1263
 1263
September 1999 events